Nicolai Elias Tuxen (21 November 1810 - 10 December 1891) was a Danish naval officer and politician, technical director of Orlogsværftet in Copenhagen. He was a member of the Danish Constituent Assembly. He was the father of painter Laurits Tuxen.

Early life
Tuxen was born in Fladstrand, the son of first lieutenant and later commander lieutenant Peter Mandrup Tuxen (1783-1838) and Elisabeth M. Simonsen (1786-1867). He was the elder brother of Georg Emil Tuxen and Johan Cornelius Tuxen.

Career
Tuxen followed the family tradition, enrolling at the Royal Danish Naval Cadet Academy in  1822. He graduated with Gerner's Medal in  1829. After a voyage to the Danish West Indies with the brig St. Jan in  1831-32 he was employed as a teacher of mathematics at the Royal Danish Naval Academy until 1846. He was promoted to first lieutenant in   1839, captain lieutenant  in  1847 and captain  in 1854.

In  1838, he was also employed as an instruction officer at the dock in Copenhagen. In 1841, he was made a member of the Construction Commission. In 1843-45, he was in England, North America, France and the Netherlands to study engineering, hydraulics and other technical advances in ship building. Back in Denmark, he was promoted to first teacher in mathematics at the Naval Academy. 

In 1946, he was appointed as leader of the navy's department for engineering, water and hydraulics.In 1858, he instigated the construction of a new dry dock in Christianshavn. In 1864, he was also appointed as director of ship building at the Royal Naval Dockyards. He retired in  1883.

Politics
In 1848, Tuxen was elected for the Danish Constituent Assembly at Nyboder. He was subsequently elected for the Folketing, first in Copenhagen's 5th Constituency (1852-54) and then in Frederiksværk Constituency (1855-58). From 1856 he was also a member of Rigsrådet. From 1878, he was appointed to the Landsting by the king.

Other activities
He was for many years one of the directors of the Det kgl. octroierede almindelige Brandassurance-Compagni. He published a number of written works, including two publications on the Tuxen family (1883 and 1888.

Personal life
Tuxen was married on 4 July 1838 in Holmen Church to Bertha Laura Giødvad (1815-1908), daughter of naval officer Jens Berlin Giødvad  (1782-1816) and Judithe Kiellerup (1788-1850). The couple had seven children, including the painters Laurits Tuxen and Nicoline Tuxen. Their sister daughter Elisabeth was married to the theologian Carl Henrik Scharling and her younger sister was married to the economist and politician Hans William Scharling.

At the time of the 1845 census his home was a first floor apartment at Store Kongensgade] No. 94 (now Wildersgade 34) in Christianshavn. He lived there with his wife and their three first children. At the time of the 1860 census his home was an apartment at  Strandgade No. 30 in Christianshavn. He lived there with his wife, seven of their children (aged seven to 19), one lodger and two maids.

Accolade
Tuxen was created a Knight in the Order of the Dannebrog in 1846. In 1851, he was awarded the Cross of Honour. In 1858, he was created a Commander in the Order of the Dannebrog. In 1768, he was also awarded the Medal of Merit.

References

External links

 Nicolai Elias Tuxen at geni.com

19th-century Danish naval officers
Tuxen family
Recipients of the Cross of Honour of the Order of the Dannebrog
Commanders of the Order of the Dannebrog
Recipients of the Medal of Merit (Denmark)
Burials at Holmen Cemetery
1810 births
1891 deaths
Members of the Constituent Assembly of Denmark

da:Nicolai Elias Tuxen